Kāsī was an ancient kingdom of India whose existence is attested during the Iron Age. The inhabitants of the Kāśī were named the Kāsikas in Pāli and the Kāśeyas and Kāśikas in Sanskrit.

Location

The Kāsī kingdom covered an area of 300 leagues. The northern border of Kasi which separated it from Kosala was the Sarpikā or Syandikā river, and the river Son formed its southern and eastern boundaries, separating it from Magadha in the east.

The capital of Kāsī was the city of Vārāṇasī, which was also named Ketumatī, Surundhana, Sudassana, Brahmavaddhana, Pupphavatī, Ramma, and Molinī.

History

The ruling clan of Kāsī appears to have been member of the Bhārata clan, and at one point Kāsī was ruled by one Dhṛtarāṣṭra​ (in Sanskrit) or Dhataraṭṭha​ (in Pāli) whom the  calls a "Bharata prince."

The Kāsikas were closely connected to the Kausalyas and the Vaidehas, and Jala Jātūkarṇya was the purohita of these three kingdoms during the reign of the Kāsika king Ajātaśatru, who was himself a contemporary of the famous Vaideha king Janaka and of Uddālaka Āruṇi's son Śvetaketu. Ajātaśatru appears in the s as engaging in philosophical discussions with Gārgya Bālāki, and the  depicts Ajātaśatru as being jealous of Janaka's fame as a patron of learning. The  calls this Ajātaśatru of Kāsī "Brahmadatta," implying that he was himself was a Brahmadatta.

The  mentions a king of Kāsī named Bhadrasena Ajātaśatrava, who was likely the son and successor of Ajātaśatru, and had been bewitched by Uddālaka Āruṇi.

Vedic texts mention two other kings of Kāsī, one named Divodāsa, and his son or descendant, named Daivadāsi Pratardana.

During the 9th century BCE, the king of Kāsī was Aśvasena, the father of the 23rd Jain Tīrthaṅkara, Pārśvanātha.

By the later Iron Age, the kingdom of Kāsī had become one of the most powerful states of Iron Age South Asia, with several s describing the Kāsika capital of Vārāṇasī as being superior to the other cities and the kingdom's rulers as having imperial ambitions. According to these s, the kings of Kāsī sought the status of King of All Kings and of Lord of all South Asia. Vārāṇasī itself was twelve leagues in size, being much larger than the cities of Mithila and Indapatta, which were both seven leagues in size, and the  called Vārāṇasī the "chief city" of all South Asia.

Kāsī was finally conquered for good by Kosala under the latter's king Kaṃsa, shortly before the time of the Buddha, due to which Kaṃsa​ was nicknamed  ("seizer of Vārāṇasī"}, and Kāsī was a full part of the kingdom of Kosala by the time of the Kauśalya king Mahākosala.

When Mahākosala's daughter Kosalādevi married the king Bimbisāra of Magadha, she was given as present a village in Kāsī which produced a revenue of a hundred thousand for bath and perfume money, while the rest of the former Kāsī kingdom remained part of the Kosala kingdom ruled by Mahākosala's son Pasenadi.

Following Bimbisāra's murder and the usurpation of the throne of Magadha by his son Ajātasattu, Pasenadi revoked his rights over the village in Kāsī, after which a war between Kosala and Magadha ensued which ended when Pasenadi captured Ajātasattu, gave him in marriage his daughter Vajirā, to whom he gifted the village in Kāsī, and restored him to his throne.

Kāsī later became a part of the empire of Magadha when Ajātasattu defeated Pasenadi's own usurper son, Viḍūḍabha, and annexed Kosala.

Notes

References

Further reading

Mahajanapadas
Ancient peoples of India